Wilson McLean (born 1937) is a Scottish illustrator and artist. He has illustrated primarily in the field of advertising, but has also provided cover art for music albums, sports magazines (including Sports Illustrated), a children's book, and other commercial endeavors.

London
Wilson McLean began his career in a London silkscreen studio at fifteen years of age and to date has won most major illustrator awards in the United States. Born in Scotland, he moved to London at the age of ten where he attended St. Martins and the Central School at night while working on the staff of magazines and design studios. This exposed him to the work of American illustrators as well as painters and convinced him that eventually he would go to America. Two years of national service stopped him painting for that period to time. He then went back to the design studios in Fleet Street for a few years doing little of interest, but working on his own drawings at night.

Copenhagen
At twenty-three, Wilson moved to Copenhagen and the beginning of a freelance career, he also married a Norwegian woman, after a year they moved to Spain, then home to London where he quickly established himself, working with publishing houses, advertising agencies and magazines.

New York City
He then decided the time was right for New York. 1965 was the year he came to New York for six weeks to try his luck. The first week an agent took him on and he got his first commission from The Saturday Evening Post which he did in a borrowed studio, that was followed by three more magazine jobs which he took back to London.

Returning in 1966 with wife and child, he moved to the Upper West Side thinking this would continue as before, but although this was a very creative time in New York and there was no shortage of work in general, McLean experienced several lean years before gaining a reputation. He realized he did not yet have a signature style and point of view and the competition was fierce, so after a couple of years or so experimenting with different mediums and observing more concept oriented pictures, gradually he accomplished a breakthrough in 1973 with important work for Look Magazine, Sports Illustrated and Playboy.

His diligence paid off and he worked for a wide variety of clients from advertising, movie posters, record covers, Time Magazine covers, book jackets, annual reports, etc. McLean's awards include several silver and gold medals at the Art Directors Club of New York plus the prestigious Clio for television commercials for Eastern Airlines. He won nine silver and four gold medals over the years at the Society of Illustrators in NY and in 1980 the Hamilton King Award for best in show, and gold that same year at the Los Angeles Art Directors Show.

Marriage
In 1974 he met and later married Rosemary Howard, an ex-model turned photographer. They shared a loft/studio in the Flatiron District of Manhattan and split their time between Southampton and NYC. The Society of Illustrators Gallery in NYC gave him a one-man show in 1978 and a few years later he went to Zurich two summers running to work on lithographs ending in a show of work there in 1984. During the years he has participated in group shows in New York and other parts of the country. He is represented at the National Portrait Gallery at the Smithsonian Institution in Washington, D.C., as well as the National Air and Space Museum in D.C., and in the London Transport Museum’s permanent poster collection. In 1985, to commemorate European Music Year, the Royal Mail commissioned him to design and illustrate five stamps for a special edition of British composers, and he designed a set of four stamps for the US mail illustrating the Broadway musical Oklahoma! around that same time.

McLean contributed to an exhibition and book for the United Nations environmental program entitled Art for Survival.

A children's book called If The Earth.. were a few feet in diameter published by the Greenwich Workshop Press which features eighteen paintings is his only experience with that genre. In the year 2000, for the Millennium, the United Kingdom's postal service commissioned a stamp, one of a number produced by such people as David Hockney and Eduardo Paolozzi.

Teaching
His teaching has included Syracuse University, The School of Visual Arts, guest workshops at Savannah College of Art and Design, Ringling College of Art and Design in Florida, as well as workshops throughout the United States.

Hudson, New York
In 2000 he and his wife moved to Hudson, New York from Long Island and Manhattan. Mclean now lives full-time in Hurley, NY

In 2007, McLean had a show of work at the John Davis Gallery in Hudson, New York. And in 2009 a show of Italian landscapes at the Conrad L. Mallett Gallery in Hartford, Connecticut. The Society of Illustrators in 2010 inducted McLean into the Hall of Fame. In 2011 McLean designed and painted the Earth Day poster which the State Department in Washington, D.C. produces each year.  In 2011 he was interviewed for the National Endowment for the Arts Art Works blog.

References

Scottish artists
Scottish emigrants to the United States
Living people
1937 births
People from Hurley, New York
People from the Upper West Side
People from the Flatiron District, Manhattan
People from Southampton (town), New York